Zinc finger protein SNAI2 is a transcription factor that in humans is encoded by the SNAI2 gene. It promotes the differentiation and migration of certain cells and has roles in initiating gastrulation.

Function 

This gene encodes a member of the Snail superfamily of C2H2-type zinc finger transcription factors. The encoded protein acts as a transcriptional repressor that binds to E-box motifs and is also likely to repress E-cadherin transcription in breast carcinoma. This protein is involved in epithelial-mesenchymal transitions and has antiapoptotic activity. It regulates differentiation and migration of neural crest cells along with other genes (e.g. FOXD3, SOX9 and SOX10, BMPs) in embryonic life. Mutations in this gene may be associated with sporadic cases of neural tube defects.

SNAI2 downregulates expression of E-cadherin in premigratory neural crest cells; thus, SNAI2 induces tightly bound epithelial cells to break into a loose mesenchymal phenotype, allowing gastrulation of mesoderm in the developing embryo. Structurally similar to anti-apoptotic Ces-1 in C. elegans, SLUG is a negative regulator of productive cell death in the developing embryo and adults.

Clinical significance 
Widely expressed in human tissues, SLUG is most notably absent in peripheral blood leukocytes, adult liver, and both fetal and adult brain tissues. SLUG plays a role in breast carcinoma as well as leukemia by downregulation of E-cadherin, which supports mesenchymal phenotype by shifting expression from a Type I to Type II cadherin profile. Maintenance of mesenchymal phenotype enables metastasis of tumor cells, though SLUG is expressed in carcinomas regardless to invasiveness. A knockout model using chick embryos has also showed inhibition of mesodermal and neural crest delamination; chick embryo Slug gain of function appears to increase neural crest production. Mutations in Slug are associated with loss of pregnancy during gastrulation in some animals.

Interactions 
BMPs precede expression of SLUG, and are suspected as the immediate upstream inducers of gene expression.

References

Further reading